{{DISPLAYTITLE:C15H10Cl2N2O2}}
The molecular formula C15H10Cl2N2O2 (molar mass: 321.158 g/mol) may refer to:

 Lonidamine
 Lorazepam

Molecular formulas